Jan Hertl (born 23 January 1929 – 14 May 1996) was a Czech footballer.

During his club career he played for Dukla Prague and Sparta Prague. He earned 23 caps and scored one goal for Czechoslovakia between 1952 and 1958, and represented the country in two World Cups.

References

External links

1929 births
1996 deaths
Czechoslovak footballers
Czechoslovakia international footballers
1954 FIFA World Cup players
1958 FIFA World Cup players
AC Sparta Prague players
Dukla Prague footballers
Association football midfielders